Columnea microcalyx, called the goldfish plant or orange columnea, is a species of flowering plant in the genus Columnea, native to southeast Mexico, Central America, Columbia and Venezuela. Its cultivar 'Superba' has gained the Royal Horticultural Society's Award of Garden Merit.

References

microcalyx
Plants described in 1866